David William Juenger (born February 4, 1951) is a former American football wide receiver in the National Football League (NFL) who played for the Chicago Bears. He played college football at Ohio University.

References 

Living people
1951 births
American football wide receivers
Ohio Bobcats football players
Chicago Bears players
Sportspeople from Chillicothe, Ohio
Players of American football from Ohio